Too Many Sopranos is an opera by Indiana University Jacobs School of Music faculty member Edwin Penhorwood.  Too Many Sopranos is a two-act opera in English with a pastiche of song from opera's various periods. A group of sopranos is trying to get into heaven, but there is no more room in the heavenly choir. So, something has to be done, and it looks like some will be sent to Hell!

Background
Penhorwood wrote many gags into the opera based on stereotypes of sopranos, opera stock plots, and traditional staging.  The Sandman is taken fully from Hänsel und Gretel, 'Unnamed Bass' is a reference to the fact that basses can be fairly anonymous in the opera community.  The piece has become a popular one for opera workshops because of the many soprano parts and its relative brevity.

Roles
St. Peter - bass-baritone
Dame Doleful - mezzo-soprano
Madame Pompous - soprano
Miss Titmouse - coloratura soprano
Just Jeannette - soprano
Sandman - soprano
Unnamed Bass - bass-baritone
Enrico Carouser - tenor
Gabriel-Angel - silent
Nelson Deadly - tenor
Orson - bass

Synopsis
Four sopranos are brought to heaven's gates, but are stopped by St. Peter.  Room has opened up in the heavenly choir for only one soprano.  Each auditions in her own way with an aria that exemplifies the traditions and excesses of its time.  The sopranos are told that if there were more tenors and basses that were in the heavenly choir, there would be no problem in letting them in. So, the sopranos go to hell to retrieve the men who have been condemned to eternal torment.  Through a few operatic "tests" like trying to remain awake for an hour (a task made harder by a stage director boring them to sleep), all the sopranos successfully gain entrance to heaven with the men in tow.

References

Western Gazette (Canada) review by Mary Ann Boateng Too Many Sopranos hits all the right notes: Opera stereotypes exposed in Edwin Penhorwood production (March 25, 2009), accessed 5 February 2010
Portland Press Herald review by Christopher Hyde, Portland Press Herald (June 22, 2008) 'Too Many Sopranos' hits the high notes on Port Opera page, accessed 5 February 2010

External links
Indiana University page on Too Many Sopranos and Edwin Penhorwood, accessed 5 February 2010
TIS music catalog page with video clips of  Too Many Sopranos, accessed 5 February 2010

English-language operas
2000 operas
Operas by Edwin Penhorwood
Operas